In astronomy, astrology, and geodesy, the prime vertical or first vertical is the vertical circle passing east and west through the zenith of a specific location, and intersecting the horizon in its east and west points.
In other words, the prime vertical is the vertical circle perpendicular to the meridian, and passes through the east and west points, zenith, and nadir of any place.

See also
Earth radius#Prime vertical
Meridian (astronomy)

References

External links

Astronomical coordinate systems